Cristian-Romulus Pîrvulescu (born January 9, 1965) is a Romanian political analyst, activist, journalist, and essayist. He is a professor at the National School of Political Studies and Public Administration (SNSPA) in Bucharest, and became its dean in December 2005.

Born in Ploieşti, Pîrvulescu graduated in 1989 from the University of Bucharest's Faculty of Philosophy, and went on to finish his education at the Paris-based Institut d'Etudes Politiques and the Fondation Nationale des Sciences Politiques. He authored his Ph.D. thesis on Tendencies and Evolutions in the Dynamics of the Western European Political Parties at the End of the 20th Century.

Pîrvulescu is an active figure in the Romanian post-1989 Revolution non-governmental organization scene. He has been president of Pro Democraţia since 1999, is a founding member of the Romanian Political Science Association, and counselor for the World Bank Comprehensive Development Frame Program. He has published a series of articles, studies and papers, and has taken part in a large number of seminars, debates, congresses, conferences, symposia and round tables.

He is a frequent editorialist, commentator and analyst in Romanian and foreign media including Curentul, Dilema, BBC, Radio Free Europe, Romanian national television, Pro TV, Radio România Actualităţi and Radio România Internaţional. Pîrvulescu was deputy editor of the monthly Sfera Politicii between 1994 and 1997.

Political party science
His early career was centered on denouncing the negative consequences of the single-party communist regime that was present in Romania between 1948 and 1989, as well as of having major former second-rank Romanian Communist Party members continue holding important governmental posts (after the Communist era, the Romanian political party system was dominated by the National Salvation Front, perceived as a neo-communist party with a small faction of democrats and reformists).

Seen as a reformist and a leader in democratic thought, Pîrvulescu was, in the early 1990s, more and more often invited as a guest on political talk shows. What he saw as the failure of the Romanian Democratic Convention government (a centre-right coalition that governed Romania between 1996 and 2000) made him more critical of the Romanian political party system—in his view, mainstream Romanian parties were more interested in immediate electoral success than in making the whole political system and the whole country work better. He also denounced the consequences of the party-list electoral system in use in Romania, which, according to him, makes members of Parliament more dependent on party decisions, letting them stray away from their own political beliefs in favor of "political party discipline". Pîrvulescu attributed the apparent problems faced by the Parliament in adopting legislation to this phenomenon.

Current activities
After the 2004 elections, Pîrvulescu, perceived by many as the most credible social and political commentator, indicated that the conflict of the two major parties in the Justice and Truth Alliance has no good effect on the EU accession of 2007.

Each Sunday, he hosts on a TVR 1 political talk show, Săptămâna Politică ("This Week in Politics") and, on Saturdays, a Realitatea TV show, Numele meu (My Name Is), which analyzes the most recent and notorious trends and persons in politics.

References

Sciences Po alumni
People from Ploiești
Romanian essayists
Romanian magazine editors
Romanian political scientists
Romanian television personalities
University of Bucharest alumni
1965 births
Living people
Romanian political journalists